Thulani Mbenge (born July 15, 1991) is a South African professional boxer. As an amateur, he won a bronze medal at the 2014 Commonwealth Games.

Amateur career
Mbenge was an outstanding amateur before joining the professional ranks, winning the South African junior welterweight championships in 2010 and 2011, and a bronze medal at the 2014 Commonwealth Games in Glasgow, Scotland.

Professional career
As a professional Mbenge has won South African, WBC, IBO and African Boxing Union titles.

Professional boxing record

References

1991 births
Living people
South African male boxers
Commonwealth Games bronze medallists for South Africa
Commonwealth Games medallists in boxing
Boxers at the 2014 Commonwealth Games
Medallists at the 2014 Commonwealth Games